Wolani (Wodani) is a Papuan language spoken by about 5,000 people in the Paniai lakes region of the Indonesian province of Papua. It is related to the Moni, Ekari, Auye, and Dao languages and may 
be related to the Dani languages. Documentation is quite limited.

Further reading
de Bruijn, J. V. 1941. Verslag van een Tocht naar Beura, het Stroomgebied van de Beurong en Lelop, het Stroomgebiet van de Ielorong in Centraal Nieuw Guinea door den Controleur der Wisselmeren van 9 Juni 1941 tot 7 Augustus 1941 [Report of a Survey Trip to Beura, the Beurong and Lelop Watersheds, the Ielorong Watershed in Central New Guinea by the Wissel Lakes Administrator the 9th of June. 1941 to the 7th of August 1941]. Nationaal Archief, Den Haag, Ministerie van Koloniën: Kantoor Bevolkingszaken Nieuw-Guinea te Hollandia: Rapportenarchief, 1950–1962, nummer toegang 2.10.25, inventarisnummer 256.
Larson, Gordon F. 1977. Reclassification of some Irian Jaya Highlands language families: A lexicostatistical cross-family subclassification with historical implications. Irian 6(2): 3–40.
Voorhoeve, Clemens L. 1975. Languages of Irian Jaya, Checklist: Preliminary Classification, Language Maps, Wordlists. Canberra: Pacific Linguistics.

References

 Doble, Marion. 1962. Essays on Kapauku grammar. Nieuw Guinea Studiën 6:152-5, 211-8, 279-98.
 Drabbe, Peter. 1952. Spraakkunst van het Ekagi, Wisselmeren, Nederlands Nieuw Guinea. Den Haag: Martinus Nijhoff.

External links 
 Paradisec has an open access collection from Arthur Cappell (AC2) that includes Wolani materials

Paniai Lakes languages
Languages of western New Guinea